Arctic Circle Restaurants is an American chain of burger and shake restaurants based in Midvale, Utah, United States. There were 71 restaurants in seven states as of September 2022 (in Utah, Idaho, Nevada, Arizona, Oregon, Washington, and Wyoming). About half are company-owned and the rest are owned by franchisees; about half of the restaurants are in Utah. They serve typical fast food such as burgers, sandwiches, shakes, salads, fries and fish and chips.

The company claims to have invented the regional condiment fry sauce, and that it was the first burger chain to invent and sell the kids' meal.

Arctic Circle once offered franchises in California, but no longer does.

See also
 List of hamburger restaurants

References

External links 

Midvale, Utah
Companies based in Salt Lake County, Utah
Restaurants in Utah
Utah cuisine
Economy of the Northwestern United States
Fast-food chains of the United States
Regional restaurant chains in the United States
Restaurants established in 1950
Fast-food hamburger restaurants
Hamburger restaurants in the United States
1950 establishments in Utah
American companies established in 1950